Saignelégier railway station is a railway station in the municipality of Saignelégier, in the Swiss canton of Jura. It is located on the  La Chaux-de-Fonds–Glovelier line of the Chemins de fer du Jura. Historically, the station was the meeting point of the two companies that built the original line, the Chemin de fer Saignelégier-La Chaux-de-Fonds and the Régional Saignelégier–Glovelier, and the Chemins de fer du Jura still maintains depot facilities adjacent to the station.

Services 
 the following services stop at Saignelégier:

References

External links 
 
 

Railway stations in the canton of Jura
Chemins de fer du Jura stations